The 2004 season of the Montserrat Championship was the seventh recorded season of top flight association football competition in Montserrat, with records for any competition held between 1975 and 1995 not available, the third iteration of the championship since the 1996–97 season was abandoned when the Soufrière Hills erupted causing widespread devastation to the island, and, as of 2015, the last recorded season of competitive football on the island. The championship was won by Ideal, their first title to date.

Participating teams
 Ideal Boys
 Montserrat Volcano Observatory Tremors
 Montserrat Secondary School
 Royal Montserrat Police Force
 Seventh Day Adventists Trendsetters

References

2004 domestic association football leagues
2004 in Montserrat
Montserrat Championship seasons